Cultural Christians are nonreligious persons who adhere to Christian values and appreciate Christian culture. As such, these individuals usually identify themselves as culturally Christians, and are often seen by practicing believers as nominal Christians. This kind of identification may be due to various factors, such as family background, personal experiences, and the social and cultural environment in which they grew up.

Contrasting terms are "biblical Christian", "committed Christian", or "believing Christian".

The term "Cultural Christian" may be specified further by Christian denomination, e.g. "Cultural Catholic", "Cultural Lutheran", and "Cultural Anglican".

Usage

Belarus
The President of Belarus, Alexander Lukashenko, has identified as cultural Christian, calling himself an "Orthodox atheist" in one of his interviews.

France
French Deists of the 18th and early 19th centuries include Napoleon. The current President of France, Emmanuel Macron, identified himself as an "Agnostic Catholic".

China
Traditionally, Christianity has been considered a "foreign religion" (means non-local religions) in China, including all the negative connotations of foreignness common in China. This attitude only started to change at the end of the 20th century. In China, the term "Cultural Christians" can refer to Chinese intellectuals devoted to the study of Christian theology, ethics, and literature, and often contribute to a movement known as Sino-Christian theology. Some of the earliest figures in this movement in the late-1980s and 1990s, such as Liu Xiaofeng and He Guanghu, were sympathetic to Christianity but chose not to associate with any local church. Since the 1990s, a newer generation of these Cultural Christians have been more willing to associate with local churches, and have often drawn on Calvinist theology.

Italy
The liberal writer Benedetto Croce, in his book  ("why we can't not call ourselves Christians"), expressed the view that Roman Catholic traditions and values formed the basic culture of all Italians, believers and non-believers, and described Christianity primarily as a cultural revolution.

The Netherlands
The provinces North Brabant and Limburg in the Netherlands are historically mostly Roman Catholic, therefore many of their people still use the term and some traditions as a base for their cultural identity rather than as a religious identity. Since the War of Independence the Catholics were systematically and officially discriminated against by the Protestant government until the second half of the 20th century, which had a major influence on the economic and cultural development of the southern part of the Netherlands.

From the Reformation to the 20th century, Dutch Catholics were largely confined to certain southern areas in the Netherlands, and they still tend to form a majority or large minority of the population in the southern provinces of the Netherlands, North Brabant and Limburg.

However, with modern population shifts and increasing secularization, these areas tend to have fewer and fewer religious Catholics. Since 1960 the emphasis on many Catholic concepts including hell, the devil, sinning and Catholic traditions like confession, kneeling, the teaching of catechism and having the host placed on the tongue by the priest rapidly disappeared, and these concepts are nowadays seldom or not at all found in modern Dutch Catholicism. The southern area still has original Catholic traditions including Carnival, pilgrimages, rituals like lighting candles for special occasions and field chapels and crucifixes in the landscape, giving the southern part of the Netherlands a distinctive Catholic atmosphere, with which the population identifies in contrast to the rest of the Netherlands. The vast majority of the (self-identifying) Catholic population in the Netherlands is now largely irreligious in practice. Research among Catholics in the Netherlands in 2007 shows that even among religious Dutch Catholics only 27% can be regarded as theist, 55% as ietsist, 17% as agnostic and 1% as atheist.

United Kingdom
Outspoken English atheist Richard Dawkins has described himself in several interviews as a "cultural Christian" and a "cultural Anglican". In his book The God Delusion, he calls Jesus Christ praiseworthy for his ethics.

United States
Thomas Jefferson, a Founding Father of the United States, considered himself part of Christian culture, despite his doubts about the divinity of Jesus.

See also

 Apatheism
 Backsliding
 Cafeteria Christianity
 Christian atheism
 Christian agnosticism
 Christian culture
 Christian deism
 Christian Identity
 Christian value
 Cultural Judaism
 Cultural Mormon
 Cultural Muslim
 Lapsed Catholic
 Nominal Christian
 Rice Christian
 Sunday Christian
 Moralistic therapeutic deism

References

External links
 Tricia C. Bruce, Cultural Catholics in the United States. Annual Review of the Sociology of Religion, Volume 9, 2018.
 David Masci, Who are ‘cultural Catholics’?, Pew Research Center. 3 September 2015.
 Mark Bauerlein, Cultural Catholics. First Things, 29 March 2019.
 Ireland and the End of Cultural Catholicism, Catholic World Report, 28 May 2018.

Christian secularism
Christian terminology
Christian
Catholic culture